Sungurlare Municipality is a municipality in Burgas Province, Bulgaria. It includes the town of Sungurlare and a number of villages with a total population of 12,559 as of 2011.

Demographics

Religion 
According to the latest Bulgarian census of 2011, the religious composition, among those who answered the optional question on religious identification, was the following:

Settlements 

Sungurlare Municipality incorporates the following 28 settlements:

References

External links

Municipalities in Burgas Province